Adrian Thaws is the tenth studio album by English trip hop musician Adrian Thaws, known professionally as Tricky. Recorded at Tricky's home studio in London, the album was released on 8 September 2014, through Tricky's own record label False Idols.

The album features guest contributions from various artists, including Nneka, Mykki Blanco, Oh Land, NoLay and Blue Daisy. On 30 June 2014 Tricky shared the track "Nicotine Love", which features vocal contributions from Irish singer Francesca Belmonte. Cover Art by Zlatimir Arakliev

Background
On the album's title, which is Tricky's birth name, Tricky stated: "Calling it 'Adrian Thaws' is saying 'You don’t really know me.' So many times, people have tried to put a finger on me and every album I go to a different place." On the album's sound, Tricky also stated:

Michelle Geslani of Consequence of Sound reported that the album features elements from "hip hop, house, jazz, blues, and reggae," while describing the track "Nicotine Love" as "a slinky, body-moving number that seems well-suited for U.K. club-hopping."

Track listing

References

External links
 

2014 albums
Tricky (musician) albums
Self-released albums
Dub albums